The streaked tuftedcheek (Pseudocolaptes boissonneautii) is a passerine bird in the ovenbird family, which breeds in the tropical New World in the coastal mountains of Venezuela, and the Andes from Venezuela to Bolivia. It is sometimes considered conspecific with the buffy tuftedcheek, P. lawrencii of Central America, Colombia and Ecuador.

It occurs as a resident breeder in wet mountain forests, with many epiphytes, above 1500 m. It lays one white egg in a thickly lined old woodpecker nest or other tree cavity. One parent, probably the female, incubates the single white egg for about 29 days to hatching.

The streaked tuftedcheek is typically 22 cm long, weighs 48 g, and has a long bright rufous tail. The back is brown with dark streaks. The head has a buff streaked dark brown cap and paler eyestripe. The cheeks sport a tuft of buff-white feathers. The throat is white and the underparts are olive brown with diffuse spotting on the breast. The sexes are similar.

This species has a hard wooden  song, often given as a duet. The call is a sharp .

The streaked tuftedcheek forages actively amongst mosses, vines, bromeliads and other epiphytes for insects, spiders, and even small amphibians. It will join mixed feeding flocks in the middle levels of the forest.

References 

 Hilty,  Birds of Venezuela, 

streaked tuftedcheek
Birds of the Northern Andes
streaked tuftedcheek
Taxobox binomials not recognized by IUCN